Sesame Place is a children's theme park and water park, located outside of Philadelphia in Middletown Township, Bucks County, Pennsylvania (with a Langhorne mailing address). It is the oldest of two theme parks in the United States based entirely on the children's educational television program Sesame Street (the other is in San Diego, California) and includes a variety of rides, shows and water attractions suited for young children. It is also the first theme park in the world to become a certified autism centre.

Sesame Place is one of the twelve theme parks owned and operated by SeaWorld Parks & Entertainment, which operates under an exclusive license from Sesame Workshop, the non-profit owner of Sesame Street.

Overview
Sesame Place is located in Middletown Township, Bucks County, Pennsylvania. The park has a "Langhorne, Pennsylvania" mailing address.

Sesame Place first opened in 1980 near the Oxford Valley Mall and initiated the expansion of the commercial complex in the vicinity. It was designed by Eric McMillan, a Canadian designer, Sandra Hanna of Lambertville, New Jersey and several other designers.

The park is open from early May through Halloween for The Count's Halloween "Spooktacular", and mid-November through December for "A Very Furry Christmas". The expansions included the construction of Cookie's Monster Land in 2014 - the park's largest renovation to date.

The theme park is described as having implemented features to make it accessible to children with autism, and on World Autism Awareness Day in 2018 was announced to be the first theme park that is a Certified Autism Center. Certified Autism Centres "[help] businesses better serve guests and clients with cognitive disorders, including autism".

In 2007, it became the first theme park in Pennsylvania to become completely smoke-free.

Beginning in January 2021, the park began its year-round operation. The park's previous operating season ran from April through early January; however, 2021 was the first time the park has ever been open during the winter months. Each weekend was a limited capacity event that featured rides, dance parties, and a parade. In 2023, Sesame Place will not continue year-round operation but will only close between mid-January to mid-February

In July 2022, the park faced criticism after a family claimed in an Instagram post that the character Rosita snubbed their two young black children by ignoring them as they waved to her. The video went viral as other users posted similar incidents of costumed characters and black children, with those on social media calling for a boycott of the park. The park released a statement that the costume had made it difficult for the performer to see the girls. They later followed with another statement that the performer had not intentionally snubbed the girls, but instead rejected a request "from someone in the crowd who asked Rosita to hold their child for a photo which is not permitted." On July 19, Sesame Place Pennsylvania formally apologised to the family and invited the family back for a personal meet-and-greet with the characters. They also announced that their employees will undergo racial bias training to ensure park guests have an "inclusive, equitable and entertaining" experience.

Related parks
Sesame Place is one of 12 parks operated by SeaWorld Entertainment. Others include its sister park Sesame Place San Diego, alongside SeaWorld Orlando, SeaWorld San Diego, SeaWorld San Antonio, Busch Gardens Tampa Bay, Busch Gardens Williamsburg, Discovery Cove, Aquatica Orlando, Aquatica San Antonio, Adventure Island and Water Country USA.

Anheuser-Busch was the park's original owner, operating it under its Busch Entertainment subsidiary. In 2008, Anheuser-Busch was purchased by InBev to form Anheuser-Busch InBev, which then sold its theme park division to The Blackstone Group in 2009. Under new ownership, from 2009 into 2010, children's areas in Busch Gardens and SeaWorld parks were converted to Sesame Street-themed areas. SeaWorld Orlando, however, was the lone holdout until its Shamu's Happy Harbour area was converted into, and reopened as, "Sesame Street Land" in 2019.

Sesame Place (Texas)
A second Sesame Place park opened in Irving, Texas in June 1982. The $10 million Texas park was located on  near State Highway 183, and differed from the Pennsylvania location in that most attractions were indoors. The Texas park never reopened after the fall season ended in October 1984 and was shut down permanently in January 1985 due to unprofitability and declining attendance.

Tokyo Sesame Place
A third park in Tokyo, Japan was open from 1990 until December 31, 2006. Despite the name, it was not affiliated with the American parks and operated independently from them.

Sesame Place San Diego

In 2017, a fourth location was announced, to open "no later than" mid-2021. In 2019, it was announced that Aquatica San Diego near San Diego, California would be replaced by a new Sesame Place theme park by Spring 2021. However, due to the COVID-19 pandemic causing construction to pause, the park did not open until the following year in March 2022.

Other Sesame Street related parks and areas
In 1994, a Sesame Street themed amusement park called Parque Plaza Sesamo (based on the Mexican co-production Plaza Sésamo) was opened in Monterrey, Mexico. According to TEA's Global Attractions Attendance Report, Parque Plaza Sésamo is one of Latin America's highest ranking theme parks by attendance, with 1.2 million visitors per year. On May 18, 2022, the park announced that it would rebrand as Parque Fiesta Aventuras for the 2022 season following a two-year period of closure. The reason for the rebranding was not governed by the park, but is likely that the park terminated its license to use the Plaza Sésamo branding and characters.

Universal Studios Japan has a Sesame Street themed section in their Universal Wonderland themed area.

In Salou, Spain, the PortAventura Park has a Sesame Street themed area called Sésamo Aventura, which opened in 2011.

Attractions

Each attraction is split into a category. Dry rides are open during Elmo's Springtacular, the summer season, The Count's Halloween Spooktacular and A Very Furry Christmas. Water rides are open only in the summer season (Memorial Day-Labor Day). Other rides are only operated during Elmo's Springtacular, The Count's Halloween Spooktacular, or A Very Furry Christmas.

Sesame Plaza
The front entrance.

Sesame City
An area themed to mass transit and a big city.

Twiddlebug Land
An area themed to the Twiddlebug characters.

Sesame Island

An area featuring water-based attractions.

Sesame Neighbourhood
A full-scale replica of Sesame Street. Opened in 1988.

The Count's Court
Themed after Count von Count and features water rides. The special Count-themed dry attractions only operate during special events and are listed below.

Elmo's World
Themed after Elmo, more specifically the Elmo's World segment.

Cookie's Monster Land
Named after Cookie Monster. Opened in 2014.

Special Event Rides
These rides only operate during specific seasonal events.

Former attractions

Entertainment
Sesame Street Party Parade  - A parade with all costume characters and has dance stops throughout the parade route. (2011–present, anniversary: 2015, 2020)
Elmo the Musical! - Magic, mayhem, and music add up in Elmo the Musical - Live at Sesame Place! Join Elmo as it's time to raise the curtain and light the lights, when this brand-new show takes over the Sesame Studio at Sesame Place. (2014–present)
The Magic of Art - Abby Cadabby is getting ready for the art show on Sesame Street. Abby isn't sure what to create. Abby asks for help from Elmo, Cookie Monster, Grover and Telly. She then learns art comes in all shapes and sized, with paintings and sculptures. They inspire Abby to use imagination and create your own masterpiece.
Our Street is Sesame Street -Elmo, Abby Cadabby and Big Bird! Sing, dance, and clap along as you watch the show at the Sesame Street Neighborhood.

Holiday shows and parades
The Count's Halloween Spooktacular Shows/Parades:
The Not Too Spooky Howl-Ween Radio Show! - A show starring the "Sesame Street" characters that they performed at the WSME theater and our Halloween broadcast. Located in "Abby's Paradise Theater". (2010–present)
Who Said Boo?! - A show at Sesame Place where Sesame Street characters went to the Count's Halloween Party but they hear an eerie BOO! Shows in the "Sesame Street Neighborhood Theater" (formerly "Monster Rock Theater"). (2014–present)
Elmo the Musical- A Halloween Adventure! - Magic, mayhem and music add up in Elmo the Musical - Live at Sesame Place! Join Elmo as it's time to raise the curtain and light the lights, when this brand-new show takes over the Sesame Studio at Sesame Place. (2014–present)
Sesame Street Halloween Parade
Our Street on Halloween
A Very Furry Christmas Shows/Parades:
A Very Merry Sesame Street Sing Along - Visitors can join their Sesame Street friends to listen to various holiday songs sung by Elmo and friends..
Sesame Street Christmas Parade
Elmo's Christmas Wish
1-2-3 Christmas Tree

Costume characters
Families can dine with some characters at Dine with Elmo and friends (or one of its seasonal variations). This is not included in the regular admission price and takes place at varying times depending on season. The characters at the dine change seasonally. Many of the Sesame Place characters strut down "Sesame Street" in the "Neighborhood Street Party" parade (or one of its seasonal variations). This features 15 Sesame Place characters, large floats, dancers and music. The park also features character meet and greets that vary through the year. During the holiday season, characters from Rudolph the Red-Nosed Reindeer appear in the park, thanks to a licensing agreement between SeaWorld Parks and Entertainment, and Character Arts LLC. The characters that feature in the park include:

Current characters

Sesame Street
Abby Cadabby (regular, parade)
Baby Bear (random)
Barkley (parade only)
Bert (regular, parade)
Big Bird (regular, parade)
Cookie Monster (regular, parade)
Count von Count (regular, parade)
Elmo (regular, parade)
Ernie (regular, parade)
Gabrielle (regular)
Grover / Super Grover (regular, parade)
Gonger (random)
A Honker and a Dinger (random)
Julia (regular)
Ji Young (Regular)
Lightning the Reindeer (seasonal)
Murray Monster (random, parade)
Oscar the Grouch (regular, parade)
Prairie Dawn (random, parade)
Rosita (regular, parade)
Rudy (regular)
Snuffleupagus (regular)
Tamir (regular)
Tango (regular)
Telly Monster (random, parade)
Zoe (regular, parade)

Other
Chocolate Chip Cookie (seasonal)
Santa Claus (seasonal)
Rudolph the Red-Nosed Reindeer (seasonal)
Clarice (seasonal)
The Bumble (seasonal)

Former characters
Hoots the Owl (removed in 2009)
Jackman Wolf (removed in 2010)

References

Further reading

External links

Sesame Place official site

Sesame Street
Amusement parks in Pennsylvania
SeaWorld Parks & Entertainment
1980 establishments in Pennsylvania
Buildings and structures in Bucks County, Pennsylvania
Tourist attractions in Bucks County, Pennsylvania